Graziano Landoni (born 24 November 1939) is an Italian football midfielder and later manager.

References

1939 births
Living people
People from Legnano
Italian footballers
F.C. Pro Vercelli 1892 players
A.C.R. Messina players
S.S. Lazio players
Atalanta B.C. players
Catania S.S.D. players
Palermo F.C. players
Ternana Calcio players
Piacenza Calcio 1919 players
A.S.D. Sorrento players
U.S. Grosseto 1912 players
Serie A players
Serie B players
Association football midfielders
Italian football managers
F.C. Grosseto S.S.D. managers
S.S. Arezzo managers
Pisa S.C. managers
Parma Calcio 1913 managers
Benevento Calcio managers
A.S. Siracusa managers
Palermo F.C. managers
Calcio Foggia 1920 managers
Trapani Calcio managers
Footballers from Lombardy
Sportspeople from the Metropolitan City of Milan